The 45th Edition Vuelta a España (Tour of Spain), a long-distance bicycle stage race and one of the three grand tours, was held from 24 April to 15 May 1990.

Defending champion Pedro Delgado was the principal favourite for the win of the race. Delgado was joined by a strong Banesto team that included Miguel Induráin and Julián Gorospe. The other Spanish favourites included 1986 winner  Álvaro Pino as well as Anselmo Fuerte and 1982 winner Marino Lejarreta. Of the potential foreign winners were the strong Colombians which included Fabio Parra and Lucho Herrera.

Pello Ruiz Cabestany won the opening time trial and took the first leader's jersey. The following day a breakaway got away and Viktor Klimov took the jersey. On the sixth stage a break won the day and took an advantage of over four minutes. Gorospe took the leader's jersey. However, on the eleventh stage, Gorospe had a bad day and lost the jersey to Marco Giovannetti who had been second on the general classification and had been in the break that gained the time on the favourites. Delgado tried to close the gap to Giovannetti over the remainder of the race but could not. Giovannetti won his first and only grand tour ahead of Delgado and Anselmo Fuerte.

Route

Results

Final General Classification

References

External links
La Vuelta (Official site in Spanish, English, and French)

 
1990
1990 in road cycling
1990 in Spanish sport